Bonhomme Township is a township in St. Louis County, in the U.S. state of Missouri. Its population was 36,316 as of the 2010 census.

Bonhomme Township takes its name from Bonhomme Creek.

References

Townships in Missouri
Townships in St. Louis County, Missouri